"Good Time Charlie's Got the Blues" is a song written and performed by Danny O'Keefe.

It was first recorded by O'Keefe in 1967, but not released. It was recorded by The Bards and released in 1968 as the b-side to the song "Tunesmith" on Parrot Records.  The Bards were a band from Moses Lake, Washington.  The song was recorded by O'Keefe for his self-titled debut album in 1971. The following year he re-recorded it (with a slower, more downbeat arrangement) for his second album, O'Keefe. The second version was issued as a single, reaching number 9 on the Billboard Hot 100 singles chart, number 5 on the adult contemporary chart, and number 63 on the country chart. The song was also recorded by Mel Tormé, especially for a 1986 episode of NBC's Night Court entitled "Leon, We Hardly Knew Ye".

It was recorded by numerous artists. A recording by Leon Russell peaked at number 63 on the Billboard Hot Country Singles chart in 1984.

Charts

Selected list of recorded versions

Willie Nelson on his album "City of New Orleans"
Conway Twitty (1977), on the album Play, Guitar Play
 The Bards (1968) on Parrot Records
Danny O'Keefe (1971), on the album Danny O'Keefe
Dwight Yoakam
Waylon Jennings recorded his version of the song for his 1973 album Lonesome, On'ry and Mean.
Mike Farris
Elvis Presley, recorded at Stax and featured on his 1974 album Good Times
Leon Russell
Chris Hillman
Earl Klugh on his 1978 album Magic in Your Eyes
Rita Wilson
Charlie Rich (1980), on the album Once a Drifter
Jerry Lee Lewis and Leon Russell
Holly Cole, from the album Night (2012)
Harry Manx (2008), from the album Live at the Glenn Gould Studio
Mel Tormé, (1986), for a Night Court episode entitled "Leon, We Hardly Knew Ye".
Nat Stuckey (1973), on the album Take Time To Love Her
Shooter Jennings (2016), on the album Black Country Rock 2015 Mixtape.
Charley Crockett on his 2018 album, Lil G.L.'s Blue Bonanza
Ronnie Dunn on his 2020 album RE-DUNN

References

External links
 

1967 songs
1972 singles
Elvis Presley songs
Willie Nelson songs
Jerry Lee Lewis songs
Leon Russell songs
Song recordings produced by Ahmet Ertegun
Songs written by Danny O'Keefe
Songs about loneliness
Songs about blues